This is an alphabetical list of notable Pakistani male film and television actors.

A 

 Aagha Ali
 Abdullah Ejaz
 Abdullah Kadwani
 Abid Ali
 Abid Kashmiri
 Abid Khan
 Adeeb
 Adeel Hussain
 Adil Murad
 Adnan Jaffar
 Adnan Malik
 Adnan Siddiqui
 Afzal Khan
 Agha Sikandar
 Ahad Raza Mir
 Ahmed Ali Butt
 Ahmed Butt
 Ahmed Jahanzeb
 Ahsan Khan
 Aijaz Aslam
 Ajab Gul
 Akmal Khan
 Alamzeb Mujahid
 Albela
 Ali Abbas
 Ali Haider
 Ali Ejaz
 Ali Rehman Khan
 Ali Zafar
 Allauddin
 Alyy Khan
 Anwar Solangi
 Arman Ali Pasha
 Arslan Asad Butt
 Asad Malik
 Asif Raza Mir
 Aslam Pervaiz
 Ather Shah Khan Jaidi
 Ayaz Samoo
 Azfar Rehman
 Asif Raza Mir

B 

 Babar Ali
 Babar Khan
 Badar Munir
 Bilal Ashraf
 Bilal Khan                                   
 Behroze Sabzwari
 Babu Baral

C

D 

 Danish Nawaz
 Danish Taimoor
 Darpan

E 

 Ejaz Durrani
 Emmad Irfani
 Emi Khan

F 

 Fahad Mustafa
 Fahad Rehmani
 Fahad Shaikh
 Faisal Rehman
 Faisal Qureshi
 Faizan Khawaja
 Farhan Ali Agha
 Farhan Saeed
 Farooq Qaiser
 Fawad Khan
 Faysal Qureshi
 Feroze Khan
 Firdous Jamal
 Furqan Qureshi

G 

 Ghulam Mohiuddin
 Ghayyur Akhtar
 Gohar Rasheed
Goher Mumtaz

H 

 Hamza Ali Abbasi
 Hamzah Tariq Jamil
 Habib-ur-Rehman
 Hameed Sheikh
 Hamid Rana
 Hassam Khan
 Hasan Jahangir
 Hayatullah Khan Durrani
 Humayun Saeed

I 

 Iftikhar Thakur
 Ilyas Kashmiri
 Imran Abbas Naqvi
 Imran Ashraf
 Imran Aslam
 Inayat Hussain Bhatti
 Iqbal Theba
 Irfan Khoosat
 Ismael Shah
 Ismail Tara
 Ismail Shahid
 Izhar Qazi

J 

 Jamal Shah
 Jamil Fakhri
 Jamshed Ansari
 Javed Sheikh
 Jawad Bashir
 Junaid Khan

K 

 Kader Khan
 Kaifee
 Kamal Ahmed Rizvi
 Kamal Irani
 Kanwar Arsalan 
 Kashif Mehmood
 Khalid Abbas Dar
 Khaled Anam
 Khayyam Sarhadi
 Kumail Nanjiani

L 

 Latif Kapadia
 Lehri
 Liaquat Soldier

M 

 Mahmood Ali
 Mehmood Akhtar
 Mehmood Aslam
 Munawar Zarif
 Malik Anokha
 Murtaza Hassan
 Mehboob Alam
 Mikaal Zulfiqar
 Mirza Shahi
 Moammar Rana
 Mohammad Ali
 Mohammed Ehteshamuddin
 Mohib Mirza
 Mohsin Abbas Haider
 Moin Akhter
 Mukarram
 Murtaza Hassan
 Mustafa Qureshi
 Mustansar Hussain Tarar

N 

 Nabeel
 Nadeem Baig
 Naeem Haq
 Naeem Hashmi
 Naeem Tahir
 Najeebullah Anjum
 Naseem Vicky
 Nasir Chinyoti
 Nayyar Ejaz
 Nazir Ahmed Khan
 Nirala
 Noman Habib
 Noman Ijaz
 Noman Masood
 Noor Hassan Rizvi
 Nouman Javaid

O 

 Omer Shahzad
 Osman Khalid Butt

Q 

 Qavi Khan
 Qazi Wajid

R 

 Rafi Khawar
 Rahat Kazmi
 Rahman Syed
 Rasheed Naz
 Rauf Khalid
 Rauf Lala
 Rizwan Wasti

S 
* Sindhyar Memon
 Saad Haroon
 Saeed Khan Rangeela
 Sheheryar Munawar Siddiqui
 Sahir Lodhi
 Sajjad Ali
 Sajjad Kishwar
 Sajid Hasan
 Salahuddin Toofani
 Saleem Sheikh
 Salim Nasir
 Salman Shahid
 Salman Saqib Sheikh
 Sami Khan
 Sami Shah
 Santosh Kumar
 Sarmad Khoosat
 Saud
 Shaan Shahid
 Shabbir Jan
 Shafi Muhammad Shah
 Shafqat Cheema
 Shahid
 Shahid Khan
 Shehroz Sabzwari
 Shahood Alvi
Shahzad Noor
Shaz Khan
 Shakeel Hussain Khan
 Shakeel
 Shamil Khan
 Shamoon Abbasi
 Shehroz Sabzwari
 Shehzad Sheikh
 Sikander Rizvi
 Sikandar Sanam
 Sohail Ahmed
 Sohail Asghar
 Sohail Sameer
 Subhani ba Yunus
 Sudhir
 Sultan Rahi
 Syed Ishrat Abbas
 Syed Kamal
 Syed Musa Raza

T

 Tariq Aziz
 Tauqeer Nasir
 Tariq Mustafa
 Tariq Teddy

U

 Umer Sharif
 Usman Peerzada

V

 Vasay Chaudhry

W 

 Wahaj Ali
 Waheed Murad
 Wajahat Rauf
 Waseem Abbas

Y 

 Yasir Nawaz
 Yasir Hussain
 Yousuf Khan

Z 

 Zain Afzal
 Zia Mohyeddin
 Zuhab Khan

See also 

 List of Pakistani actresses
 List of Pakistani models

References

Actors
Lists of actors by nationality
Actors, male
Pakistani